The 2020–21 Eastern Kentucky Colonels men's basketball team represented Eastern Kentucky University in the 2020–21 NCAA Division I men's basketball season. The Colonels, led by third-year head coach A. W. Hamilton, played their home games at McBrayer Arena within Alumni Coliseum in their 73rd and final season as members of the Ohio Valley Conference. EKU joined the ASUN Conference on July 1, 2021.

Previous season
The Colonels finished the 2019–20 season 16–17, 12–6 in OVC play to finish in fourth place. They defeated Tennessee State in the quarterfinals, before losing to Belmont in the semifinals.

Roster

Schedule and results 

|-
!colspan=12 style=| Regular season

|-

!colspan=12 style=|Ohio Valley tournament

|-

Source

References

Eastern Kentucky Colonels men's basketball seasons
Eastern Kentucky Colonels
Eastern Kentucky Colonels men's basketball
Eastern Kentucky Colonels men's basketball